Parectecephala is a genus of grass flies in the family Chloropidae. There are about 6 described species in Parectecephala.

Species
Parectecephala aristalis (Coquillett, 1898)
Parectecephala dissimilis (Malloch, 1914)
Parectecephala eucera (Loew, 1863)
Parectecephala maculiceps Becker, 1912
Parectecephala maculosa (Loew, 1872)
Parectecephala sanguinolenta (Loew, 1863)

References

Further reading

External links

 Diptera.info

Chloropinae
Taxa named by Theodor Becker
Diptera of North America